Red Line is a 1959 Finnish drama film directed by Matti Kassila. It is based on the 1909 novel of the same name by Ilmari Kianto. The film was entered into the 1st Moscow International Film Festival; however, the reception at the film festival was poor due to the exaggerated character of a social democratic agitator (played by Jussi Jurkka) and weak quality of the film's subtitles.

In 1959, the film won five Jussi Awards in the following categories: Best Screenplay (Matti Kassila), Best Original Score (Osmo Lindeman), Best Actor (Holger Salin), Best Supporting Actor (Jussi Jurkka) and Best Supporting Actress (Rakel Laakso).

Plot
The film dates back to critical points in Finnish history, until 1906, when a new law guaranteeing universal and equal suffrage was enacted, and until 1907, when the Finnish people went to the parliamentary election for the first time to draw a "red line." The main characters are Romppainen's couple, Topi and Riika, who live in a backwood cottage with their five children. The knowledge of the election and the hope for change will bring faith to the future of the poor family at Christmas.

Cast
 Holger Salin as Topi Romppanen
 Liisa Nevalainen as Riika Romppanen
 Petri Tanner as Sake
 Jukka Eklund as Vesteri
 Marianne Eronen as Petti
 Terhi Virtanen as Iita Linta Maria
 Tiina Jokela as Pirjeri
 Jussi Jurkka as Agitator Puntarpää
 Rakel Laakso as Kunilla
 Tarmo Manni as Simana Arhippaini
 Pentti Irjala as Shoemaker Raappana
 Tyyne Haarla as Cupper Kaisa
 Toivo Mäkelä as Jussi Kettuvaara

References

External links
 
 

1959 films
1959 drama films
1950s Finnish-language films
Finnish black-and-white films
Films directed by Matti Kassila
Films based on Finnish novels
Finnish drama films
Films about socialism